Kistefos is a privately owned investment company owned by Christen Sveaas and led by CEO Tom Ruud. 
The company comprises wholly  owned and part-owned industrial companies within offshore, shipping, and IT, as well as strategic investments in various listed and unlisted companies, principally within banking/ finance,  telecommunications and property.

The company dates back to 1889 when Sveaas' family founded the lumber mill Kistefos Træsliberi.

References

External links
Official website

Holding companies of Norway
Real estate companies of Norway
Companies based in Oslo
Holding companies established in 1889
Private equity companies of Norway
1889 establishments in Norway